Cannabis is a six-part 2016 French-language TV series created by Hamid Hlioua and starring Kate Moran, Christophe Paou and Yasin Houicha. The plot revolves around how on a boat in the middle of the Mediterranean halfway between Spain and Africa, two tons of marijuana are stolen and a man goes missing and the people it involves in the aftermath.

It was released on December 8, 2016 on Arte.

The series was a Netflix Original title in many regions however departed in June 2020.

Cast
 Kate Moran as Anna
 Christophe Paou as Morphée
 Yasin Houicha as Shams
 Jean-Michel Correia as Yassine
 Pedro Casablanc as El Feo
 Saïd El Mouden as Saïd
 Ruth Vega Fernandez as Nadja
 Radivoje Bukvic as Mirko
 Farida Rahouadj as Djemila
 Carima Amarouche as Zohra Kateb
 Isaac Kalvanda as Big Ben
 Younes Bouab as Farid
 Pep Tosar as Papi
 Santi Pons as Comandante
 Mar Sodupe as Inès Torres
 Nanou Harry as Amie de Djemila
 Yuri D. Brown as Trafiquant Hollandais
 Assaad Bouab as Jalil Djebli
 Julius Cotter as Trafiquant Anglais

References

External links
 
 

2010s French television series
French-language television shows
2016 French television series debuts